Human tower may refer to:
 Human tower (gymnastic formation), a performance variation of the gymnastic formation, exhibited frequently in Japan
 Human pyramid
 Castells, human towers built in Catalonia
 Govinda sport, human towers built in India